Lana Montalbán is an Argentine journalist, TV anchor, and producer. Her career has spanned over thirty years across both the United States and Argentina, and she has been recognized through various awards for best anchorwoman.

Career 

Montalban started her career in broadcast journalism in the U.S., leading the National News Telemundo HBC in 1987 and then WNJU channel 47 of New York until 1992. She returned to her native Buenos Aires, Argentina to lead the investigative journalism program Edicion Plus, which won the Martin Fierro award for best news show in Argentina. Over her career, Montalban has anchored and/or produced the following programs: 
 Prime time anchor, reporter, and producer for "International Panorama" on Telefé Network (national network)
Anchor, investigative reporter, and producer for "Edicion Plus" on Telefé Network (national network)
 Anchor of the talk show "Pura Lana" on Siempre Mujer channel
 Correspondent for NBC News (USA)
Prime time news anchor, reporter and producer for the nightly news on Channel 9 (national network)
 Prime time news anchor, reporter, and producer for the nightly news on Channel 7 (national network)
Anchor, producer, and director for Perfiles Productions
Freelance correspondent and producer for Channel 13 (national network)
 Freelance correspondent for CNN (USA)
 Producer for "Historias Para Contar" on Univision
Anchor for "En Exclusivo" and co-anchor for "Mundo Hola" on HOLA TV!
Current events columnist for "Despierta America" on Univision

Besides her native Spanish, Montalban speaks fluent English, Portuguese, and Italian, as well as basic French. Currently, she lives in Miami, Florida.

References

External links 
 Lana Montalbán returns to TV talk show - Terra Colombia

Argentine women journalists
Living people
Year of birth missing (living people)